Muksino (Möqsin; , Möxsin) is a rural locality (a village) in Ishlinsky Selsoviet, Aurgazinsky District, Bashkortostan, Russia. The population was 37 as of 2010. There is 1 street.

Geography 
Muksino is located 31 km north of Tolbazy (the district's administrative centre) by road. Starokuzyakovo is the nearest rural locality.

References 

Rural localities in Aurgazinsky District